The Bradača Monastery is a Serbian Orthodox Monastery near Požarevac. It was first mentioned in 1566 but was most likely built at the end of the 14th century and the start of the 15th. By 1677 the monastery was already abandoned and in 1826 it was razed and destroyed. It was re-constructed in 1992 and became operational again.

References

Religious organizations disestablished in the 17th century
1992 establishments in Serbia
Serbian Orthodox monasteries in Serbia